Halina Maria Frąckowiak (born 10 April 1947 in Poznań) is a Polish pop and rock singer, composer and author.

Career 

In 2008, she recorded a new version of her hit "Papierowy księżyc" alongside the band Muchy.

Personal life 

She is associated with the political scientist , with whom she has a son, Filip Frąckowiak.

In 1990, on the way to a concert in Gorzów Wielkopolski, she had a serious road accident in which she broke both her legs and suffered facial harm from broken glass. Although the facial injuries healed relatively quickly with no visible scars, the leg injuries were more serious and required weeks of treatment and months of rehabilitation.

In 2010, she joined a committee endorsing Jarosław Kaczyński for President of Poland.

Discography 

 1974 Idę
 1977 Geira (backed by SBB)
 1981 Ogród Luizy (with Józef Skrzek)
 1983 Serca gwiazd
 1987 Halina Frąckowiak
 2005 Przystanek bez drogowskazu… Garaże gwiazd

References

External links 

 Official website

Recipients of the Medal of the Centenary of Regained Independence
1947 births
Recipients of the Bronze Medal for Merit to Culture – Gloria Artis
Recipients of the Silver Medal for Merit to Culture – Gloria Artis
Musicians from Poznań
Living people
Recipient of the Meritorious Activist of Culture badge